Premagni is a 1989 Indian Kannada-language film directed by  T. S. Nagabharana and produced by V. Varghees. The film stars Arjun Sarja, Khushbu, Sundar Krishna Urs and Shashikumar in the lead roles. The film has a musical score by Hamsalekha. The film was dubbed into Tamil as Thennattu Venghai.

Cast

Arjun Sarja
Khushbu
Sundar Krishna Urs
Shashikumar
Tara
Sathyapriya
Shankar Rao
Chinna Kasaragod
C. R. Shashikumar
Nagesh Mayya
Jackie Shivu
Shivaprakash
Chikka Suresh
Ramashankar
Shekar
Sriranga
Madhu
Prema
Rani
Naveena
Mala
Saritha
Madhavi

References

External links
 
 

1989 films
1980s Kannada-language films
Films directed by T. S. Nagabharana